Clitheroe Interchange is the main transport interchange in the market town of Clitheroe and the Ribble Valley district in Lancashire, England. It consists of several bus stops, Clitheroe railway station and a coach parking space. It is operated and maintained by Lancashire County Council. All trains are run by Northern. The ticket and information office permanently closed on February 5, 2020 due to a loss in funding.

Location
The interchange is located in the southern half of Clitheroe, near the town centre. It is near the Platform Gallery, Maxwell's restaurant, Dawsons department store, the Inn at the Station and Booths supermarket.

Bus services
Bus services are operated by The Blackburn Bus Company, The Burnley Bus Company, Stagecoach, Pilkington Bus and Holmeswood Coaches whose routes serve many of the surrounding major towns and a number of the smaller rural villages.

Rail Services
Northern run services to Rochdale via Blackburn and Manchester Victoria
 DalesRail trains run through to Settle and Carlisle

References

External links
Lancashire County Council

Clitheroe
Bus stations in Lancashire
Buildings and structures in Ribble Valley